Talbot is an unincorporated community in Hickory Grove Township, Benton County, in the U.S. state of Indiana. It is part of the Lafayette, Indiana Metropolitan Statistical Area.

History

The town of Talbot was laid out by Ezekiel M. Talbot (chief engineer of the LM&B Railroad) and his wife Marietta on February 18, 1873, the plat consisting of 71 lots.  The couple would also lay out the nearby town of Ambia two years later.  In the 1920s, Talbot had a population of about 200, plus a Methodist church, grain elevator, grade school and eight to ten businesses.

A post office was established at Talbot in 1873, and remained in operation until it was discontinued in 1995.

Geography
The Kankakee, Beaverville and Southern Railroad passes through the town, and intersects the short Bee Line Railroad a mile to the west at a point known as Handy.

References

Unincorporated communities in Benton County, Indiana
Lafayette metropolitan area, Indiana
Unincorporated communities in Indiana